To the End is a 2022 American documentary film directed by Rachel Lears. The film focuses on climate change and features U.S. Representative Alexandria Ocasio-Cortez, Varshini Prakash, the co-founder of the Sunrise Movement, Alexandra Rojas, executive director of the Justice Democrats, and Rhiana Gunn-Wright, the climate policy director for the Roosevelt Institute. The film debuted at the 2022 Sundance Film Festival and was presented at the Tribeca Film Festival in June 2022.

Reception
While the film was generally well received by critics, the film failed to meet expectations at the box office. During its opening weekend, the film was shown on 120 screens across the United States, earning $9,667.

References

2022 documentary films
American documentary films